USNS Effective (T-AGOS-21) is a Victorious-class ocean surveillance ship acquired by the U.S. Navy in 1993 and assigned to the Navy's Special Mission Program.

Built in Morgan City, Louisiana
Effective was built by Mc Dermott Shipyards, Morgan City, Louisiana. She was laid down on 15 February 1991 and launched 26 September 1991 and was delivered to the Navy on 27 January 1993 which assigned her to the Military Sealift Command (MSC) Special Missions Program.

Mission 
The mission of Effective is to directly support the Navy by using both passive and active low frequency sonar arrays to detect and track undersea threats.

Operational history
There is no current operational history on Effective.

Honors and awards
Effective personnel are qualified for the following medals:
 National Defense Service Medal

References
 NavSource Online: Service Ship Photo Archive - T-AGOS-21 Effective
 Special Mission Program 
 USNS EFFECTIVE   (T-AGOS 21)

Note

There is no journal entry on Effective at DANFS.

Victorious-class ocean surveillance ships
Ships built in Morgan City, Louisiana
Small waterplane area twin hull vessels
1991 ships
Military catamarans